Hyman Bass (born October 5, 1932) is an American mathematician, known for work in algebra and in mathematics education. From 1959 to 1998 he was Professor in the Mathematics Department at Columbia University. He is currently the Samuel Eilenberg Distinguished University Professor of Mathematics and Professor of Mathematics Education at the University of Michigan.

Life
Born to a Jewish family in Houston, Texas, he earned his B.A. in 1955 from Princeton University and his Ph.D. in 1959 from the University of Chicago.  His thesis, titled Global dimensions of rings, was written under the supervision of Irving Kaplansky.

He has held visiting appointments at the Institute for Advanced Study in Princeton, New Jersey, Institut des Hautes Études Scientifiques and École Normale Supérieure (Paris), Tata Institute of Fundamental Research (Bombay), University of Cambridge, University of California, Berkeley, University of Rome, IMPA (Rio), National Autonomous University of Mexico, Mittag-Leffler Institute (Stockholm), and the University of Utah. He was president of the American Mathematical Society.

Bass formerly chaired the Mathematical Sciences Education Board (1992–2000) at the National Academy of Sciences, and the Committee on Education of the American Mathematical Society. He was the President of ICMI from 1999 to 2006.  Since 1996 he has been collaborating with Deborah Ball and her research group at the University of Michigan on the mathematical knowledge and resources entailed in the teaching of mathematics at the elementary level. He has worked to build bridges between diverse professional communities and stakeholders involved in mathematics education.

Work
His research interests have been in algebraic K-theory, commutative algebra and algebraic geometry, algebraic groups, geometric methods in group theory, and ζ functions on finite simple graphs.

Awards and recognitions
Bass was elected as a member of the National Academy of Sciences in 1982. In 1983, he was elected a Fellow of the American Academy of Arts and Sciences. In 2002 he was elected a fellow of The World Academy of Sciences. He is a 2006 National Medal of Science laureate. In 2009 he was elected a member of the National Academy of Education. In 2012 he became a fellow of the American Mathematical Society. He was awarded the Mary P. Dolciani Award in 2013.

See also

Bass number
Bass–Serre theory
Bass–Quillen conjecture

References

External links

Directory page at University of Michigan
 Author profile in the database zbMATH

1932 births
20th-century American Jews
Algebraists
Columbia University faculty
Fellows of the American Academy of Arts and Sciences
Fellows of the American Mathematical Society
Living people
Mathematics educators
Members of the United States National Academy of Sciences
National Medal of Science laureates
Institute for Advanced Study visiting scholars
Nicolas Bourbaki
Presidents of the American Mathematical Society
Academics from Houston
Princeton University alumni
University of Chicago alumni
University of Michigan faculty
Mathematicians from Texas
21st-century American Jews